The 2023 Spain Masters (officially known as the Madrid Spain Masters 2023) is a badminton tournament which is scheduled to be held at the Centro Deportivo Municipal Gallur in Madrid, Spain, from 28 March to 2 April 2023 with a total prize of $210,000.

Tournament
The 2023 Spain Masters is the ninth tournament of the 2023 BWF World Tour and also part of the Spain Masters championship, which has been held since 2018. This tournament is organized by the Spanish Badminton Federation and sanctioned by the BWF.

Venue
This international tournament will be held at the Centro Deportivo Municipal Gallur in Madrid, Spain.

Point distribution
Below is the point distribution for each phase of the tournament based on the BWF points system for the BWF World Tour Super 300 event.

Prize money
The total prize money for this tournament is US$210,000. Distribution of prize money was in accordance with BWF regulations.

Men's singles

Seeds

 Kenta Nishimoto
 Kanta Tsuneyama
 Chico Aura Dwi Wardoyo
 Anders Antonsen
 Srikanth Kidambi
 Rasmus Gemke
 Wang Tzu-wei
 Toma Junior Popov

Finals

Top half

Section 1

Section 2

Bottom half

Section 3

Section 4

Women's singles

Seeds

 Carolina Marin
 P. V. Sindhu
 Busanan Ongbamrungphan
 Nozomi Okuhara
 Gregoria Mariska Tunjung
 Michelle Li
 Hsu Wen-chi
 Beiwen Zhang

Finals

Top half

Section 1

Section 2

Bottom half

Section 3

Section 4

Men's doubles

Seeds

 Fajar Alfian /  Muhammad Rian Ardianto
 Satwiksairaj Rankireddy / Chirag Shetty 
 Kim Astrup / Anders Skaarup Rasmussen
 Leo Rolly Carnando / Daniel Marthin
 Muhammad Shohibul Fikri / Bagas Maulana
 Lu Ching-yao / Yang Po-han
 Mark Lamsfuss / Marvin Seidel
 Ben Lane / Sean Vendy

Finals

Top half

Section 1

Section 2

Bottom half

Section 3

Section 4

Women's doubles

Seeds

 Apriyani Rahayu / Siti Fadia Silva Ramadhanti
 Jongkolphan Kititharakul / Rawinda Prajongjai
 Benyapa Aimsaard / Nuntakarn Aimsaard
 Gabriela Stoeva / Stefani Stoeva
 Baek Ha-na / Lee So-hee
 Treesa Jolly / Gayatri Gopichand Pullela
 Febriana Dwipuji Kusuma / Amalia Cahaya Pratiwi
 Linda Efler / Isabel Lohau

Finals

Top half

Section 1

Section 2

Bottom half

Section 3

Section 4

Mixed doubles

Seeds

  Dechapol Puavaranukroh / Sapsiree Taerattanachai
  Thom Gicquel / Delphine Delrue
  Mark Lamsfuss / Isabel Lohau
  Goh Soon Huat / Lai Shevon Jemie
  Rinov Rivaldy / Pitha Haningtyas Mentari
  Supak Jomkoh / Supissara Paewsampran
  Rehan Naufal Kusharjanto / Lisa Ayu Kusumawati
  Mathias Christiansen / Alexandra Bøje

Finals

Top half

Section 1

Section 2

Bottom half

Section 3

Section 4

References

External links
 Tournament Link

Spain Masters
Spain Masters
Spain Masters
Sports competitions in Barcelona